Asterolepis engis is a species of moth of the family Tortricidae. It is found in Sabah.

The wingspan is about 14 mm. The ground colour of the forewings is yellowish cream with a weak brownish admixture. The markings are yellow brown and broad costally and represented by lines marked with appressed scales otherwise. The hindwings are pale orange cream. Adults have been recorded on wing in May.

Etymology
The species name the very close relation with Asterolepis cypta and is derived from Greek engis (meaning a very close relative).

References

Moths described in 2012
Tortricini
Moths of Malaysia
Taxa named by Józef Razowski